KINX is a radio station in Great Falls, Montana.

It can also refer to:
KIMO, a radio station known as KINX from 2001 to 2011
Korea Internet Neutral Exchange, a Korean internet exchange service